Aldarovo (Aldar) is a rural locality (a village) in Azyakovsky Selsoviet, Burayevsky District, Bashkortostan, Russia. The population was 66 as of 2010. There are 2 streets.

Geography 
Aldarovo is located 18 km southeast of Burayevo (the district's administrative centre) by road. Ilikovo is the nearest rural locality.

References 

Rural localities in Burayevsky District